Casper Dyrbye Næsted (born 19 June 1996) is a Danish alpine ski racer.

He competed at the 2015 World Championships in Beaver Creek, US, in the slalom.

He represented Denmark at the 2018 Winter Olympics. He competed at the 2022 Winter Olympics.

World Cup results

Results per discipline

Standings through 24 February 2021

World Championship results

Olympic results

Other results

European Cup results

Results per discipline

Standings through 24 February 2021

Far East Cup results

Results per discipline

Standings through 24 February 2021

References

External links

1996 births
Danish male alpine skiers
Living people
Alpine skiers at the 2018 Winter Olympics
Alpine skiers at the 2022 Winter Olympics
Olympic alpine skiers of Denmark